Evgeniya Petrovna Maykova (née Gusyatnikova, December 29, 1803 – July 1, 1880) was a writer and poetess, the mistress of a literary salon, the wife of Nikolay Maykov, the mother of Apollon, Valerian, Vladimir, Leonid Maykov.

Biography
Born in a large family of a merchant–gold miner Peter Gusyatnikov from his second marriage. She spent her childhood and youth in Moscow. Having lost her father early, she was raised by her mother, a Lutheran of Prussian origin, Natalya Ivanovna. She received a good home education. "A slender beautiful brunette, with an oblong aristocratic face", young Gusyatnikova was a rich bride. On July 30, 1820, she married a poor retired hussar Nikolai Maykov (1794–1873). Their wedding was in Moscow in the Exaltation of the Cross Church in the former Holy Cross Monastery. The couple lived either in Moscow in the house of the Gusyatnikovs, or in the suburbs, in the Maykov Estate in the village of Nikolsky near the Trinity–Sergius Lavra.

Since 1834, the Maikovs lived permanently in Saint Petersburg, where in the 1830–1840s there was a literary salon in their house. They constantly gathered writers, musicians and artists: Ivan Goncharov, Vladimir Benediktov, Pyotr Ershov, Ivan Turgenev, Nikolai Nekrasov and others. In 1846, Fyodor Dostoevsky met the Maykovs. For many years, Evgeniya Petrovna was the center of an artistic and creative family and friendly circle. She actively participated in the Maykovs' handwritten editions: in the magazine "Snowdrop" (1835, 1836, 1838) and the almanac "Moonlight Nights" (1839). Possessing a literary gift, she wrote poems and novels. Under the signatures in the 1840s–1850s, she was published in the magazines "Library for Reading" and "Family Circle", in the early 1860s in the magazine "Snowdrop".

According to others, Maykova was "an excellent, smart, kind woman". "Such women are not often found", wrote Ivan Goncharov, who appreciated her literary judgments. Vladimir Benediktov treated Maykova with great reverence and dedicated poems to her. She died in June 1880 and was buried next to her husband at the Novodevichy Cemetery in Saint Petersburg.

References

Sources
Maykova, Evgeniya Petrovna // Encyclopedic Dictionary of Brockhaus and Efron: In 86 Volumes (82 Volumes and 4 Additional Ones) – Saint Petersburg, 1890–1907

1803 births
1880 deaths
Russian women writers
19th-century women writers
Women writers from the Russian Empire
Russian salon-holders
Burials at Novodevichy Cemetery (Saint Petersburg)